Makua was an Alaafin of the Oyo Empire who died after ruling for two months in 1797. In the List of rulers of the Yoruba state of Oyo, Makua is the 32nd Alaafin of Oyo.

See also
Oyo Empire
Rulers of the Yoruba state of Oyo

Alaafins of Oyo
18th-century rulers in Africa
Year of birth missing
Year of death missing